Maurício Grabois (2 October 1912 – 25 December 1973) was a Brazilian politician of Jewish descent, founder of the modern Communist Party of Brazil and one of its leaders until his death in 1973.

Biography 
Maurício Grabois was born in Salvador, Bahia, a city on the northeast coast of Brazil. His parents were Agustin and Dora Grabois. He graduated from the State Gymnasium of Salvador, an elementary school in his city. At the age of 19 he moved to Rio de Janeiro to study at the Military School of Realengo (which would later become the Academia Militar de Agulhas Negras). There he became an Marxist-Leninist and spread communism in the military college.

Activism 
In Rio de Janeiro, Grabois joined the Communist Youth of Brazil and at the age of twenty-two became its leader. After joining the National Liberation Alliance (Aliança Nacional Libertadora), an organization which gathered anti-fascist military officers he became one of the leaders of the unsuccessful Communist uprising of November, 1935 in Rio de Janeiro, Natal, and Recife.

After the failed uprising, he became the editor of an underground Communist newspaper, A Classe Operária (the Working Class). He was arrested in 1941 and released the following year. The overthrow of Getúlio Vargas resulted in the legalization of Communist organizations of Brazil. In 1945 Maurício Grabois was elected federal congressman and became a member of the Foreign Relations Committee of Brazil.

Death 
After the Brazilian coup d'état of 1964, Grabois became a proponent of armed struggle to overthrow the military regime. In 1966 the Communist Party of Brazil decided that urban guerrilla warfare tactics were necessary to establish a Communist regime in Brazil. In 1967 Grabois started recruiting guerilla combatants in Pará and after a series of clashes with government forces, Grabois had disappeared and later was revealed to have been killed in 1973. Contemporary reports claim he was executed by Major ; a military report places the date of his death at December 25. His death has yet to be officially recognized by the government.

See also
List of solved missing person cases

References 

1912 births
1970s missing person cases
1973 deaths
Stalinism
Anti-revisionists
Brazilian communists
Far-left politics in Brazil
Communist Party of Brazil politicians
Dead and missing in the fight against the military dictatorship in Brazil (1964–1985)
Enforced disappearances in Brazil
Jewish Brazilian politicians
Jewish socialists
Missing people
Missing person cases in Brazil
People murdered in Brazil